Air VIA was a charter airline with its head office in Sofia, Bulgaria, that operated charter flights on behalf of European tour operators. Most Air VIA flights operated from European destinations into Varna Airport and Burgas Airport, the airline also offered wet lease subservices.

History

The airline was founded and started operations in 1990 as Varna International Airways. The company is licensed and certified according to the national and European standards for non-regular transport of passengers. In 1990, Air VIA started operations with five new Tupolev TU-154M. After the airline was founded by a group of private Bulgarian investors the company initially performed charter flights for Bulgarian and leading European tour operators such as Neckermann, TUI Travel, Jetairfly and Prodintour to and from Bulgarian seaside resorts.

In 2005, Air VIA's management decided to completely change the fleet due to the ever growing competition, EU regulations, environmental responsibility, increasing fuel prices and higher customer requirements. In summer 2006, Air VIA became the first Bulgarian airline to operate the Airbus A320 family and phased out the dated Tupolev 154. On 28 August 2015, prior to its demise, Air Via added its first Airbus A321-200 to its fleet.

In 2016, Air VIA ceased flight operations.

Destinations

Air Via mainly operated charter flights between the Bulgarian seaside airports Burgas and Varna and countries in Western Europe and the Middle East.

Fleet

, the Air VIA fleet consisted of the following aircraft:

Incidents and accidents
 On 24 May 2013, Air VIA flight 502 from Leipzig to Varna overshot the runway at Varna Airport after touchdown because of tailwind. Two people on board were injured during evacuation.
 On 4 July 2014, in clear weather and calm winds, the Air VIA's A320 flight 501 from Varna to Leipzig failed to land within length of runway 08R and touched down hard short of the runway threshold. The aircraft bounced and touched down for a second time at the very beginning of the runway (in the area of the 'piano keys') in a nose-high attitude resulting in a tailstrike. The landing run was completed normally and the A320 taxied to the main apron without assistance. Nobody was injured. Substantial damage occurred to the aft fuselage.

References

External links

Official website

Defunct airlines of Bulgaria
Airlines established in 1990
Airlines disestablished in 2016
2016 disestablishments in Bulgaria
Defunct charter airlines
Bulgarian companies established in 1990